Laredo Heat is an American soccer team based in Laredo, Texas, United States. Founded in 2004, the team plays in the National Premier Soccer League (NPSL), the fourth tier of the American Soccer Pyramid. They were members of the USL Premier Development League from 2004 to 2015.  The club was on hiatus for the 2016 and 2017 seasons.

The team plays its home games at the Texas A&M International University Soccer Complex, where they have played since 2008. The team's colors are red, black and white.

History

2004
Laredo Heat initially joined the USL Premier Development League in 2004 as an expansion franchise, playing a limited 'exploratory' schedule of eight exhibition games against selected opponents, but only managed two wins, both over the Lafayette Swamp Cats, 4–0 and 5–0, the latter of which featured a hat trick from striker Nelson Mata-Meza. Former Tampa Bay Mutiny, D.C. United and US national team striker Roy Lassiter played for Laredo in their 2–1 loss to DFW Tornados, but did not get on the score sheet. He also played in a 1–1 draw against UNAM.

2005
Laredo's first true competitive season was 2005, and the team proved to be a formidable opponent almost immediately. They won their opening game 3–0 over Austin Lightning, and followed that with three wins in their next four games, before being brought back down to earth with a bump following a 7–0 hammering at the hands of the traditional regional powerhouses, El Paso Patriots. The Heat rallied to register three more wins in June, including two hugely impressive wins on their trip to Tennessee, with a 5–0 thumping of Nashville Metros and a 5–1 drubbing of Memphis Express. Despite losing three of their last four games down the home stretch, including back-to-back losses away at the New Orleans Shell Shockers, Laredo held off Austin Lightning to finish second in the Mid-South Division and claim a playoff spot at their first serious attempt. At the Southern Conference playoff tournament, Laredo dispatched Southeast Division champions Cocoa Expos 2–1 in the semifinals, but lost to El Paso in the final. Dionisio Infante was Laredo's top scorer for the season, with 8 goals, while both Hector Vallejo-Medina and Juan Ibarra contributed 5 assists.

2006
Laredo's emergence as a true PDL powerhouse began in 2006. They began their season with a 9-game winning streak, proving to be a dominant force both at home and on the road: they scored an 88th-minute winner to beat Austin Lightning 4–3 on the opening day, enjoyed a comfortable 3–0 win over DFW Tornados, came from behind to beat traditional rivals El Paso Patriots 3–2, and beat Austin for a second time, 4–1 on the road in mid-June. Laredo's only losses came at the hands of DFW and El Paso, the latter a comfortable 3–0 win for the Patriots on their home turf in the final game of the season, but by that time Laredo had already wrapped up their first divisional title by 16 points from the Tornados, and were into the playoffs for the second straight year. They won their conference semifinal 3–2 over Augusta Fireball with two late goals from substitute Arnoldo Presas-Delgado, and secured their first ever conference championship by beating Bradenton Academics 2–1 with an 89th-minute winner from Dionisio Infante. Their first trip to the national stage saw them taking on Eastern Conference champions Westchester Flames; with yet another dogged performance, Laredo came from two goals down to win 3–2 with Dionisio Infante scoring an 89th-minute winner for the second game in a row. The Heat hosted the 2006 PDL Championship Game, which was broadcast live on Fox Soccer Channel, where they faced Central Conference champions Michigan Bucks. Unfortunately for Laredo, and despite the support of 7,000 home fans, lightning couldn't strike three times, and Michigan held on to win 2–1 and take their first PDL title. Nevertheless, reaching the national final was a monumental feat for a second year franchise, and boded well for the future. Hector Vallejo-Medina was Laredo's top scorer, with 7 goals, and Steve Su contributed 6 assists.

2007
Laredo retained their Mid South Division title in style in 2007, losing just two regular season games all year long. Despite never really overwhelming any of their opponents in games, Laredo were dogged and determined, grinding our comfortable 1–0 and 2–0 wins over their opponents, doing just enough to remain consistent all year. They began the season strongly, with a 3–0 win over Baton Rouge Capitals on the opening day of the season, and despite dropping points to El Paso, New Orleans and Austin, remained at the top end of the divisional standings throughout May. They beat DFW Tornados 4–1 at home on June 1, kick-starting their season into action; they lost just one more game, a tight 1–0 decision on the road against El Paso Patriots, but were dominant elsewhere, closing the season with four straight wins and a bizarre 3–3 tie with Mississippi Brilla, who fought back from being 3–0 down at half time and equalized with an 87th-minute penalty kick! They finished the regular season 8 points clear of El Paso at the top of the Mid South Division standings, and hosted the Southern Conference playoffs for a second year. After comfortably dispatching Central Florida Kraze 4–0 on the conference semifinal, they then beat Southeast Division champions Carolina Dynamo to retain their Conference championship and book their place in the national Final Four for the second straight year. Their opponents there were Western Conference champs Fresno Fuego, who proved to be dogged competition; Laredo eventually scored an 84th-minute winner through teenager Felix Garcia, and held out for a 1–0 win to take their place in the 2007 PDL Championship Game. The game, which Laredo hosted, saw them facing off again against Central Conference champions Michigan Bucks, the first time in PDL history that the same teams had qualified for consecutive championship games. After a tense 0–0 tie through regular time and extra time, Laredo sent their 6,640 home fans crazy by winning the penalty shoot-out 4–3. Felix Garcia struck the winning kick past Bucks keeper Steve Clark. The shootout was notable for the injury to Michigan striker Kenny Uziogwe who, after taking a penalty kick which was saved by Laredo keeper Ryan Cooper, immediately collapsed in agony with cramp; however, when the referee called the penalty back due to Cooper being off his line, Uziogwe was unable to continue, and despite receiving treatment for 10 minutes on the field, had to be substituted during the shoot-out.

2008
As 2-time PDL Championship finalists and reigning national champions, Laredo were expected to be competitive in 2008, and did not disappoint. They started strongly, with two ties and a win in their opening three games, but were unexpectedly beaten 1–0 by expansion team Austin Aztex U23, who proved to be their regular-season nemesis. Laredo stuttered slightly in June, having to come from behind to tie 3–3 with New Orleans Shell Shockers, fighting back strongly to register three consecutive three goal victories, but then losing twice in two days to the El Paso Patriots, ensuring that the fight for the playoff spots would be a close one themselves, El Paso and Austin. Their second loss of the season to the Aztex, a 1–3 decision in which head coach Israel Collazo was sent off after the final whistle, seemed to light a fire under the Heat, who rallied to finish the regular season with three straight wins. They annihilated Houston Leones 7–0, and beat the New Orleans Shell Shockers 4–0 on the final day with a hat trick from Felix Garcia to secure second place in the division by one point from El Paso, squeaking into the playoffs by the narrowest of margins. Laredo traveled to Florida for the Southern conference tournament; they beat Central Florida Kraze 2–1 in the semifinal, and exacted sweet revenge over Austin Aztex U23 by beating them 3–1 in the conference championship game, thereby securing their third straight title, and their third consecutive trip to the national final four. Their opponents in the semifinal were the surprise Eastern champs, Reading Rage, who they beat 2–0 to advance to their third straight PDL Championship Game, and in doing so became the first team in PDL history to achieve such a feat. In the final they faced Central Conference champions Thunder Bay Chill, and despite taking the lead, and despite Thunder Bay having a man sent off, had to settle for a 1–1 tie after extra time. Laredo were forced to endure a penalty shootout for the second year in a row; however, unfortunately for their 3,451 fans, Thunder Bay triumphed in the shootout to take the title. Young sensation Felix Garcia was Laredo's top scorer, with 11 goals (and was also named PDL U19 Player of the Year), while Juan Ibarra contributed 8 assists.

2009
In the Mid South Division 2009 Season the Laredo Heat finished on top of the table with 7 wins, 1 loss and 8 ties. The Heat managed to score 29 goals and received 18 during the season. At the  Division finals the Heat beat the West Texas United Sockers 1:0. At the Conference Finals Laredo lost against  the Cary Clarets 1:3 and were eliminated. 
The Laredo Heat did not participate in the 2009 Lamar Hunt U.S. Open Cup.

2010
In the Mid South Division 2010 Season the Laredo Heat finished on top of the table with 9 wins, 5 losses and 2 ties. The Heat managed to score 36 goals and received 19 during the season. At the Division finals the Heat tied to the Baton Rouge Capitals 1:1 but lost in the penalty shootout 5:6 and were eliminated. 
The Laredo Heat did not participate in the 2010 Lamar Hunt U.S. Open Cup.

2011
In the Mid South Division 2011 Season the Laredo Heat finished on top of the table with 11 wins, 3 losses and 2 ties. The Heat managed to score 35 goals and received 13 during the season. At the Conference Semifinals the Heat beat the Central Florida Kraze 1:0. In the Conference Final the Heat beat the Mississippi Brilla in a penalty shootout 7:6 after tying 2:2. In the semifinals Laredo beat the Long Island Rough Riders 4:1. In the 2011 PDL Championship game the Laredo Heat lost 0:1 against the Kitsap Pumas.
The Laredo Heat did not participate in the 2011 Lamar Hunt U.S. Open Cup.

2012
In the Mid South Division 2010 Season the Laredo Heat finished on top of the table with 10 wins, 3 losses and 3 ties. The Heat managed to score 31 goals and received 15 during the season. At the Conference Semifinals the Heat lost to the Orlando City U-23 1:2 and were eliminated. 
At the 2012 Lamar Hunt U.S. Open Cup the Laredo Heat beat the Houston ASC New Stars from the USASA in the first round 4:2. In the second round Laredo faced the San Antonio Scorpions from the North American Soccer League and lost the match 0:2, the match was played at San Antonio and the Heat were eliminated.

2013
In the Mid South Division 2013 Season the Laredo Heat finished second in their division with 8 wins, 2 losses and 4 ties. The Heat managed to score 30 goals and received 13 during the season. At the Conference Semifinals the Heat beat the Ocala Stampede 2:0. In the Conference Final Laredo faced their division rivals the Austin Aztex and lost 0:2 and were eliminated. The Austin Aztex went on to win the 2013 PDL Championship game.
At the 2013 Lamar Hunt U.S. Open Cup the Laredo Heat beat the Irvine PSL Elite from the USASA in the first round 2:0. In the second round Laredo faced the Fort Lauderdale Strikers from the North American Soccer League and lost in a penalty shootout 7:6 after tying the game 1:1, the match was played at Fort Lauderdale and the Heat were eliminated.

2014
In the Mid South Division 2014 Season the Laredo Heat finished second in their division with 7 wins, 4 losses and 3 ties. The Heat managed to score 23 goals and received 16 during the season. At the Conference Semifinals the Heat faced the Ocala Stampede a rematch of last year's Conference Semifinals but this year the Laredo Heat fell to Ocala after tying the match 1:1 after AET. In the penalty shootout Laredo missed their first kick and the Stampede made all the penalties, Laredo lost 5:4.
At the 2014 Lamar Hunt U.S. Open Cup the Laredo Heat beat the Miami Red Force FC from USASA, 2:1 in the second round at home. In the third round Laredo faced the Fort Lauderdale Strikers from the North American Soccer League and won the match 3:2 playing at Fort Lauderdale. In the fourth round Laredo played against the Houston Dynamo from the Major League Soccer in Houston and lost the match 0:1, this is the farthest Laredo has made it at the Lamar Hunt U.S. Open Cup.

2016
The Heat decided to opt out of the PDL's 2016 season, citing the slow growth of the Mid-South Division as the reason.

2017
The Heat announced they will be part of an expansion team of the National Premier Soccer League in 2018.

2018
The Heat's first season in the NPSL went very well. Winning all matches in the Lone Star Conference during the 2018 season. Laredo finished as top seed in the league guaranteeing them home matches until the final if they make it that far. The team became the Lone Star Conference Champions beating Houston Dutch Lions 4:3 in overtime.  The team finished the regular season 10–0–0 before losing in the Sweet 16 of the NPSL Championships 2–1 in overtime.

Team

Current technical staff 
As at April 2018.

Current roster

Notable former players

  Armando Begines, played for Chivas USA and Querétaro F.C.
  Roy Lassiter, played for L.D. Alajuelense, D.C. United, Miami Fusion and Kansas City Wizards
  Lexton Moy, played for the Philippines national football team
  Yaikel Perez, plays for the Cuba national football team
  Javier Santana, plays for FC Tuggen and Dominican Republic national football team

Year-by-year

Events hosted by the Laredo Heat

April 20, 2006: Laredo Heat vs Tigres UANL
May 24, 2006: Laredo Heat vs Chivas de Guadalajara
July 9, 2008: Laredo Heat vs Mexico U-20

Honors
 NPSL Lone Star Conference Champions 2018
 USL PDL Southern Conference Champions 2011
 USL PDL Mid South Division Champions 2011
 USL PDL Mid South Division Champions 2010
 USL PDL Mid South Division Champions 2009
 USL PDL Southern Conference Champions 2008
 USL PDL Champions 2007
 USL PDL Southern Conference Champions 2007
 USL PDL Mid South Division Champions 2007
 USL PDL Southern Conference Champions 2006
 USL PDL Mid South Division Champions 2006

Head coaches
  Lance Noble (2004)
  Eddie Silva (2004)
  Eleazar Jepson (2005)
  Israel Collazo (2006–2011)
  Fernando Hernandez (2012–2015)
  Daniel Galvan (2015)
  Dana Taylor (2018)

Stadia
 Veterans Field; Laredo, Texas (2004)
 The Student Activity Center; Laredo, Texas (2005–2007)
 Texas A&M International University Soccer Complex; Laredo, Texas (2008–present)

Average attendance
Attendance stats are calculated by averaging each team's self-reported home attendances from the historical match archive at https://web.archive.org/web/20100105175057/http://www.uslsoccer.com/history/index_E.html.

 2004: 1,300
 2005: 542
 2006: 705 (9th in PDL)
 2007: 737 (10th in PDL)
 2008: 974
 2009: 1,228 (7th in PDL)
 2010: 989 (10th in PDL)

References

External links

Official Site
Official PDL site

Association football clubs established in 2004
USL League Two teams
Soccer clubs in Texas
Sports in Laredo, Texas
2004 establishments in Texas